SuperKitties is a computer-animated television series created by Paula Rosenthal, produced by Silvergate Media and premiered on Disney Junior on January 11, 2023.

In January 2023, the series was renewed for a second season.

Premise
In the fictional city of Kittydale, an indoor playground is where children play with the place's resident cats Ginny, Sparks, Buddy, and Bitsy. When trouble occurs in the city, the cats' collars flash and sound with the words "Kitty Cat, Kitty Cat" as they are called into action by whoever contacts them. The cats enter their underground headquarters called the SuperKitty Cavern and transform into the SuperKitties, who possess special abilities and access to tools they can use to help the citizens. They use these tools to solve problems while showing kindness to everyone, including the villains causing the problems in the first place.

Characters

SuperKitties
 Ginny (voiced by Emma Berman) - The leader of the SuperKitties. She has claws that allow her to climb and poke objects.
 Sparks (voiced by Cruz Flateau) - He uses his high-tech devices from his SuperKitty Kit to help with cases and connect with the citizens. Sparks' SuperKitty Kit can produce any gadget or turn into any mode of transportation including the SuperKitty Copter.
 Buddy (voiced by JeCobi Swain) - The largest of the SuperKitties and Sparks' brother. He possesses super-strength and has the ability to perform a "furball blitz" which allows him to roll into objects.
 Bitsy (voiced by Pyper Braun) - The smallest of the SuperKitties who can harness super-speed with her "Bitsy Boots". The newest and youngest member of the team, she records her lessons from the case in vlogs on her tablet, concluding with the comment "And I'm taking that to heart!" followed by a wink. Bitsy will often say "Oopsie-kitty!" after making mistakes, even when the SuperKitties assume their superhero appearances.

Recurring
 Amara (voiced by Carly Hughes) - The owner of the indoor playground where the SuperKitties reside.
 Sam and Eddie (voiced by Dee Bradley Baker) - Two pigeons who are among the SuperKitties' callers.
 Captain FluffNStuff (voiced by Jan Johns) - A dog who is among the SuperKitties' callers.
 Magda (voiced by Kari Wahlgren) - The guard dog of the museum. She has a nephew named Rockland.
 Peanut (voiced by Gracen Newton) - A dalmatian puppy owned by a little girl named Nadia who is among the SuperKitties' callers.

Villains
 Cat Burglar (voiced by Justin Guarini) - A gray tabby cat who loves to swipe items. He is also a pianist as seen in "Piano Problem".
 Lab Rat (voiced by Ruth Pferdehirt) - A rat scientist who can create high-tech devices to serve her own purposes.
 Otto - A mute purple octopus and Lab Rat's assistant/best friend who lives on land.
 Mr. Puppypaws (voiced by James Monroe Iglehart) - A small dog with a Danish accent who is often seen riding on a motorized pet stroller. He owns a rubber duck named Quacksley that he often speaks to.
 Zsa Zsa (voiced by Isabella Crovetti) - A vain cockatoo who loves to sing and dance.
 Zsa Zsa's Squad (vocal effects provided by Dee Bradley Baker) - The budgie henchmen of Zsa Zsa.

Episodes

Notes

References

External links
 
 

2020s American animated television series
2020s American children's television series
2020s Canadian animated television series
2020s Canadian children's television series
2020s preschool education television series
2023 American television series debuts
2023 Canadian television series debuts
American children's animated superhero television series
American computer-animated television series
American preschool education television series
Animated preschool education television series
Animated television series about cats
Canadian children's animated superhero television series
Canadian computer-animated television series
Canadian preschool education television series
Disney Junior original programming
English-language television shows
Television series by Disney
Television series by Sony Pictures Television